The women's scratch at the 2011 Dutch National Track Championships in Apeldoorn took place at Omnisport Apeldoorn on December 30, 2011. 18 athletes participated in the contest, of whom 14 finished.

Competition format
Because of the number of entries, there were no qualification rounds for this discipline. Consequently, the event was run direct to the final. The competition consisted on 40 laps, making a total of 10 km.

Race
With a few laps to go Ellen van Dijk raced clear of the bunch. Within the last lap Van Dijk was pulled back by Nathalie van Gogh and so the race ended in a bunch sprint. Kirsten Wild won the sprint, ahead of Nathalie van Gogh and Roxane Knetemann.

Results
The race started at 18:45.

DNF = Did not finish.
Results from uci.ch.

References

2011 Dutch National track cycling championships
Dutch National Track Championships – Women's scratch
Dutch